Karen Sylvia Doggenweiler Puente  (born August 27, 1969 in Puelche) is a popular Chilean journalist and TV presenter.

Doggenweiler is the daughter of Félix Doggenweiler Heim, of Swiss-German descent and Silvia Lapuente, of Spanish-Aragonese descent. She is married to the Chilean politician Marco Enríquez-Ominami. The marriage produced a child named Manuela. Karen started her TV career as the hostess of a morning show alongside Felipe Camiroaga in Televisión Nacional de Chile.

In 2007, Doggenweiler hosted the show El Baile en TVN with Rafael Araneda. On January 2 of 2008, Félix Doggenweiler, Karen's father, died due to a cancer. Days after she started a new TV show, La Familia del Último Pasajero and later Estrellas en el Hielo. In summer 2009, Karen Doggenweiler hosted Calle 7 with Martín Cárcamo and Todos a Coro. At the time she had been co-hosting the reality show Pelotón III with Rafael Araneda on TVN.

Filmography

TV shows
TVN

 24 Horas (1991–1995)
 NBA JAM deportivo (1997)
 Pase lo que Pase (1998–2001)
 Super Salvaje (animales) (2002)
 La Gran Sorpresa (2002)
 Tocando las Estrellas (2003)
 Buenos días a todos (2002–2004, 2011-2016)
 Chile Elige (2006)
 El Baile en TVN (2006–2008)
 Viña Tiene Festival (2008)
 La Familia del Último Pasajero (2008)
 Estrellas en el hielo: El baile (2008)
 Calle 7 (2009)
 Todos a Coro (2009)
 Pelotón III (2009)
 Abre los Ojos (2009-2010)
 Fuerza Chile (2010)
 Circo de Estrellas (2010)
 Circo, Detrás de la Magia (2010)
 Halcón y Camaleón (2010)
 Pelotón V (2010)
 Animal Nocturno (2010-2011)
 Mamá a los 15 (2011-)
 Factor X (2011-)
 Dime por qué? (2011)
 La dieta del Lagarto'' (2011)

References

External links
 

1969 births
Chilean women journalists
Chilean television presenters
Chilean people of Swiss-German descent
Progressive Party (Chile) politicians
Gabriela Mistral University alumni
Living people
People from Santiago
Chilean women television presenters
Chilean television personalities